Art Jericho is a contemporary art gallery in Jericho, northwest central Oxford, England.

The gallery is managed by Jenny Blyth Fine Art. It participates in the annual Oxfordshire Artweeks art festival each May and holds regular temporary exhibitions for artists. Concerts are sometimes held at the gallery.

References

External links
 Art Jericho website

Year of establishment missing
Art museums and galleries in Oxfordshire
Contemporary art galleries in England
Buildings and structures in Oxford
Culture in Oxford
Tourist attractions in Oxford